"Ma Boy" is the first single by South Korean girl group Sistar's sub-unit SISTAR19. It was released online as a digital single on May 3, 2011 through Starship Entertainment.

The song was a commercial success, peaking at number 2 on the Gaon Digital Chart. The song has sold over 2,652,474 downloads as of 2011.

Release
On April 28, 2011, it was announced the creation of the sub-unit SISTAR19. The new group, which features Sistar's main vocalist Hyorin and rapper Bora, debuted on May 3.

Sistar19 released the teaser for their single "Ma Boy" on April 28, 2011. The single was released on digital music sites on May 3, 2011. The official music video was unveiled on the same day.

On May 12, 2011 Sistar19 released a rehearsal video for their track, "Ma Boy".

The song was written and produced by Brave Brothers.

A special version of "Ma Boy" was later included on Sistar's first full album So Cool which, in addition to the regular members of Sistar19, included vocals from the two other Sistar group members, Soyou and Dasom.

The song was included in sub-unit's first single album, Gone Not Around Any Longer.

Promotion
Sistar19 had their debut stage on M! Countdown on May 5, 2011. The group also performed "Ma Boy" on various music shows such as Music Bank, Music Core and Inkigayo in May and April.

Commercial performance
"Ma Boy" entered at number 5 on the Gaon Digital Chart on the chart issue dated May 1–7, 2011, with 291,397 downloads sold and 1,249,909 streams. In its second week, the song climbed to number 3 and peaked at number 2 in its third week.

The song entered at number 2 on the Gaon Digital Chart for the month of May 2011, with 1,372,864 downloads sold and 12,625,061 streams. It also charted at number 21 for the month of June and at number 65 for the month of July.

The song placed at number 14 on the Gaon Digital Chart for the year 2011, with 2,652,474 downloads sold and 21,560,202 streams accumulated.

Track listing

Charts

Credits and personnel
Hyorin - vocals
Bora - vocals, rap
Brave Brothers - producing, songwriting, arranger, music

References

External links
 
 
 

Sistar songs
2011 singles
Korean-language songs
Starship Entertainment singles
2011 songs
Songs written by Brave Brothers